The Fiji national badminton team represents Fiji in international badminton team competitions. It is administered by the Fiji Badminton Association. Fiji competed in the 2017 Sudirman Cup.  They finished in 25th place.

The Fijian mixed team won bronze three times in the Oceania Badminton Championships. The women's team also won bronze in the 2018 Oceania Badminton Championships.

Participation in BWF competitions

Sudirman Cup

Participation in Oceania Badminton Championships

Men's team

Women's team
{| class="wikitable"
|-
! Year !! Result
|-
| 2018 ||  Third place
|}Mixed team'''

Current squad 
The following players were selected to represent Fiji at the 2019 Oceania Badminton Championships.

Male players
Ahmad Ali
Burty James Molia
Liam Fong
Leon Jang

Female players
Andra Whiteside
Ashley Yee
Danielle Whiteside
Sristi Nadan

References

Badminton
National badminton teams
Badminton in Fiji